Loris Brogno (born 18 September 1992) is a Belgian professional footballer who plays as a forward for Azerbaijani club Zira.

Career
Brogno started his professional career with Charleroi and played his first official match in the Belgian Pro League on 23 March 2011, replacing Massimo Bruno after 57 minutes in a 0–3 loss to Cercle Brugge. That year, Charleroi relegated to the Belgian Second Division and Brogno only seldom played any matches. As a result, he chose to move to newly promoted Oud-Heverlee Leuven during the 2011–12 winter transfer window, where his uncle Toni Brogno had also played before.

As soon as OH Leuven was clear of relegation, Loris got some playing chances, scoring his first goal on 21 March 2012 in a 3–1 home win against Sint-Truiden. During the 2012–13 season, Brogno appeared in 8 matches for OH Leuven, but to allow the youngster to get more playing time, Brogno was loaned out to Lommel United for the following season. After this season his contract with OH Leuven ended, allowing him to move to Mons. He played one season for Mons but was allowed to leave at the end of the 2014–15 season as Mons went bankrupt and folded. He signed for Sparta Rotterdam on 8 June 2015. After three season in the Netherlands with Sparta, Brogno signed for Beerschot Wilrijk in May 2018.

On 18 August 2021, he signed a two-year contract with Zira in Azerbaijan.

Honours

Club
Sparta Rotterdam
 Eerste Divisie: 2015–16

References

External links

1992 births
Living people
Sportspeople from Charleroi
Footballers from Hainaut (province)
Association football forwards
Belgian footballers
Belgian people of Italian descent
R. Charleroi S.C. players
Oud-Heverlee Leuven players
Lommel S.K. players
R.A.E.C. Mons players
Sparta Rotterdam players
K Beerschot VA players
Zira FK players
Belgian Pro League players
Challenger Pro League players
Eerste Divisie players
Eredivisie players
Azerbaijan Premier League players
Belgian expatriate footballers
Expatriate footballers in the Netherlands
Belgian expatriate sportspeople in the Netherlands
Expatriate footballers in Azerbaijan
Belgian expatriate sportspeople in Azerbaijan